The Vorarlberg S-Bahn is a label for regional rail services in the Austrian state of Vorarlberg. In addition to Vorarlberg, the network connects to the German town of Lindau and the Swiss town of St. Margrethen.

Establishment 
In December 2005, the first Bombardier Talents were given S-Bahn branding. However, only VVV timetables designated these services as such - ÖBB ran them as a standard regional service, and only later the S1 and S3 lines took over. Since December 2020, mbs' services on the S4 line are also designated as S-Bahn.

Fleet modernization began in 2018 to the  standard. This includes a new paint scheme, new seat covers, and passenger information monitors.

Lines 
ÖBB operates lines the lines 1, 2, and 3 while Montafonerbahn operates line 4.

S1: Lindau - Bludenz  

The S1 is the busiest of the Vorarlberg S-Bahn's lines. S-Bahn and Regional-Express trains run on separate tracks in intervals of less than ten minutes. Since December 2011, between Bregenz and Bludenz there is a time interval of 30 minutes until 23:00. The most important urban transport hubs along the route are Bludenz Station, Bregenz Railway Station, Dornbirn and Feldkirch.

S3: Bregenz - St. Margrethen  
S3 trains currently run every half an hour, with some hourly services in the mornings and evenings. The line was expanded to an almost continuous half-hourly coverage until 2016. With its terminus in St. Margrethen, the S3 provides connection to the S-Bahn St. Gallen. The most important metro node along the route is Lustenau. All former R and REX trains on the route become S-Bahn trains but retain their old stopping pattern.

S4: Schruns - Bludenz  
S4 trains run primarily on an hourly basis.

S2 (proposed): Feldkirch - Buchs  
The Feldkirch–Buchs railway is already operated by ÖBB. Proposals are underway to upgrade the line and designate it as part of the S-Bahn network, under the project name "S-Bahn Liechtenstein" (de; formerly S-Bahn FL.A.CH). A Letter of Intent was signed between Austria and Liechtenstein in April 2020.

Rolling Stock 

ÖBB currently operates 1st-generation Bombardier Talent Class 4024s across all its S-Bahn lines. ÖBB signed an agreement to purchase up to 300 new Bombardier Talent 3 units for delivery from mid-2019. However, Bombardier is behind on testing and the Talent 3 is yet to be delivered, prompting the refurbishment of the existing Talent 1 series.

ÖBB has now decided to re-tender the contract, after a single unit was given for passenger testing in November 2020.

References

External links 
 

Vorarlberg
Vorarlberg
Vorarlberg
Transport in Vorarlberg
Passenger rail transport in Liechtenstein
Cross-border railway lines in Switzerland
Cross-border railway lines in Germany